Baroota Reservoir is a reservoir on the western edge of the southern Flinders Ranges of South Australia. It was built in 1921 to supply additional water to Port Pirie as part of the Beetaloo Reservoir distribution network. The dam is no longer used to supply drinking water, but is maintained as an emergency water source in the event that the Morgan-Whyalla pipeline fails. It is also used for a small amount of irrigation.

The reservoir does not fill every year. When completed in 1921, it did not fill to the spillway until 1932.  The original spillway was replaced in the mid-1950s and again in 1978.

At the time, the government funded the development of several proposals, as South Australia had wind and solar power generation, and grid-connected batteries but no pumped hydro storage. If the project is developed, it is expected to provide between 200 MW and 270 MW with up to eight hours of storage. The proposal would use the Baroota Reservoir as the lower pond and establish a new upper reservoir for water to be pumped and stored. Rise Renewables also has a proposal for the Bridle Track Solar Project which could provide electricity to power the pump.

References

Reservoirs in South Australia
1921 establishments in Australia